Crystal Cove can refer to:
 Crystal Cove State Park
 Crystal Cove Historic District, which is part of Crystal Cove State Park
 Crystal Cove State Marine Conservation Area
 Crystal Cove, a fictional town from the series Scooby-Doo! Mystery Incorporated and Velma
 Crystal Cove, the codename for a revised version of the Oculus Rift developer kit